Porangonycha princeps is a species of beetle in the family Cerambycidae, and the only species in the genus Porangonycha. It was described by Henry Walter Bates in 1872.

References

Hemilophini
Beetles described in 1872